Copper (29Cu) has two stable isotopes, 63Cu and 65Cu, along with 27 radioisotopes. The most stable radioisotope is 67Cu with a half-life of 61.83 hours, while the least stable is 54Cu with a half-life of approximately 75 ns. Most have half-lives under a minute. Unstable copper isotopes with atomic masses below 63 tend to undergo β+ decay, while isotopes with atomic masses above 65 tend to undergo β− decay. 64Cu decays by both β+ and β−.

68Cu, 69Cu, 71Cu, 72Cu, and 76Cu each have one metastable isomer. 70Cu has two isomers, making a total of 7 distinct isomers. The most stable of these is 68mCu with a half-life of 3.75 minutes. The least stable is 69mCu with a half-life of 360 ns.

List of isotopes 
|-
| 52Cu
| style="text-align:right" | 29
| style="text-align:right" | 23
| 51.99718(28)#
|
| p
| 51Ni
| (3+)#
|
|
|-
| 53Cu
| style="text-align:right" | 29
| style="text-align:right" | 24
| 52.98555(28)#
| <300 ns
| p
| 52Ni
| (3/2−)#
|
|
|-
| 54Cu
| style="text-align:right" | 29
| style="text-align:right" | 25
| 53.97671(23)#
| <75 ns
| p
| 53Ni
| (3+)#
|
|
|-
| rowspan=2|55Cu
| rowspan=2 style="text-align:right" | 29
| rowspan=2 style="text-align:right" | 26
| rowspan=2|54.96605(32)#
| rowspan=2|40# ms [>200 ns]
| β+
| 55Ni
| rowspan=2|3/2−#
| rowspan=2|
| rowspan=2|
|-
| p
| 54Ni
|-
| 56Cu
| style="text-align:right" | 29
| style="text-align:right" | 27
| 55.95856(15)#
| 93(3) ms
| β+
| 56Ni
| (4+)
|
|
|-
| 57Cu
| style="text-align:right" | 29
| style="text-align:right" | 28
| 56.949211(17)
| 196.3(7) ms
| β+
| 57Ni
| 3/2−
|
|
|-
| 58Cu
| style="text-align:right" | 29
| style="text-align:right" | 29
| 57.9445385(17)
| 3.204(7) s
| β+
| 58Ni
| 1+
|
|
|-
| 59Cu
| style="text-align:right" | 29
| style="text-align:right" | 30
| 58.9394980(8)
| 81.5(5) s
| β+
| 59Ni
| 3/2−
|
|
|-
| 60Cu
| style="text-align:right" | 29
| style="text-align:right" | 31
| 59.9373650(18)
| 23.7(4) min
| β+
| 60Ni
| 2+
|
|
|-
| 61Cu
| style="text-align:right" | 29
| style="text-align:right" | 32
| 60.9334578(11)
| 3.333(5) h
| β+
| 61Ni
| 3/2−
|
|
|-
| 62Cu
| style="text-align:right" | 29
| style="text-align:right" | 33
| 61.932584(4)
| 9.673(8) min
| β+
| 62Ni
| 1+
|
|
|-
| 63Cu
| style="text-align:right" | 29
| style="text-align:right" | 34
| 62.9295975(6)
| colspan=3 align=center|Stable
| 3/2−
| 0.6915(15)
| 0.68983–0.69338
|-
| rowspan=2|64Cu
| rowspan=2 style="text-align:right" | 29
| rowspan=2 style="text-align:right" | 35
| rowspan=2|63.9297642(6)
| rowspan=2|12.700(2) h
| β+ (61%)
| 64Ni
| rowspan=2|1+
| rowspan=2|
| rowspan=2|
|-
| β− (39%)
| 64Zn
|-
| 65Cu
| style="text-align:right" | 29
| style="text-align:right" | 36
| 64.9277895(7)
| colspan=3 align=center|Stable
| 3/2−
| 0.3085(15)
| 0.30662–0.31017
|-
| 66Cu
| style="text-align:right" | 29
| style="text-align:right" | 37
| 65.9288688(7)
| 5.120(14) min
| β−
| 66Zn
| 1+
|
|
|-
| 67Cu
| style="text-align:right" | 29
| style="text-align:right" | 38
| 66.9277303(13)
| 61.83(12) h
| β−
| 67Zn
| 3/2−
|
|
|-
| 68Cu
| style="text-align:right" | 29
| style="text-align:right" | 39
| 67.9296109(17)
| 31.1(15) s
| β−
| 68Zn
| 1+
|
|
|-
| rowspan=2 style="text-indent:1em" | 68mCu
| rowspan=2 colspan="3" style="text-indent:2em" | 721.6(7) keV
| rowspan=2|3.75(5) min
| IT (84%)
| 68Cu
| rowspan=2|(6−)
| rowspan=2|
| rowspan=2|
|-
| β− (16%)
| 68Zn
|-
| 69Cu
| style="text-align:right" | 29
| style="text-align:right" | 40
| 68.9294293(15)
| 2.85(15) min
| β−
| 69Zn
| 3/2−
|
|
|-
| style="text-indent:1em" | 69mCu
| colspan="3" style="text-indent:2em" | 2741.8(10) keV
| 360(30) ns
|
|
| (13/2+)
|
|
|-
| 70Cu
| style="text-align:right" | 29
| style="text-align:right" | 41
| 69.9323923(17)
| 44.5(2) s
| β−
| 70Zn
| (6−)
|
|
|-
| style="text-indent:1em" | 70m1Cu
| colspan="3" style="text-indent:2em" | 101.1(3) keV
| 33(2) s
| β−
| 70Zn
| (3−)
|
|
|-
| style="text-indent:1em" | 70m2Cu
| colspan="3" style="text-indent:2em" | 242.6(5) keV
| 6.6(2) s
|
|
| 1+
|
|
|-
| 71Cu
| style="text-align:right" | 29
| style="text-align:right" | 42
| 70.9326768(16)
| 19.4(14) s
| β−
| 71Zn
| (3/2−)
|
|
|-
| style="text-indent:1em" | 71mCu
| colspan="3" style="text-indent:2em" | 2756(10) keV
| 271(13) ns
|
|
| (19/2−)
|
|
|-
| 72Cu
| style="text-align:right" | 29
| style="text-align:right" | 43
| 71.9358203(15)
| 6.6(1) s
| β−
| 72Zn
| (1+)
|
|
|-
| style="text-indent:1em" | 72mCu
| colspan="3" style="text-indent:2em" | 270(3) keV
| 1.76(3) µs
|
|
| (4−)
|
|
|-
| rowspan=2|73Cu
| rowspan=2 style="text-align:right" | 29
| rowspan=2 style="text-align:right" | 44
| rowspan=2|72.936675(4)
| rowspan=2|4.2(3) s
| β− (>99.9%)
| 73Zn
| rowspan=2|(3/2−)
| rowspan=2|
| rowspan=2|
|-
| β−, n (<.1%)
| 72Zn
|-
| 74Cu
| style="text-align:right" | 29
| style="text-align:right" | 45
| 73.939875(7)
| 1.594(10) s
| β−
| 74Zn
| (1+, 3+)
|
|
|-
| rowspan=2|75Cu
| rowspan=2 style="text-align:right" | 29
| rowspan=2 style="text-align:right" | 46
| rowspan=2|74.94190(105)
| rowspan=2|1.224(3) s
| β− (96.5%)
| 75Zn
| rowspan=2|(3/2−)#
| rowspan=2|
| rowspan=2|
|-
| β−, n (3.5%)
| 74Zn
|-
| rowspan=2|76Cu
| rowspan=2 style="text-align:right" | 29
| rowspan=2 style="text-align:right" | 47
| rowspan=2|75.945275(7)
| rowspan=2|641(6) ms
| β− (97%)
| 76Zn
| rowspan=2|(3, 5)
| rowspan=2|
| rowspan=2|
|-
| β−, n (3%)
| 75Zn
|-
| style="text-indent:1em" | 76mCu
| colspan="3" style="text-indent:2em" | 0(200)# keV
| 1.27(30) s
| β−
| 76Zn
| (1, 3)
|
|
|-
| 77Cu
| style="text-align:right" | 29
| style="text-align:right" | 48
| 76.94785(43)#
| 469(8) ms
| β−
| 77Zn
| 3/2−#
|
|
|-
| 78Cu
| style="text-align:right" | 29
| style="text-align:right" | 49
| 77.95196(43)#
| 342(11) ms
| β−
| 78Zn
|
|
|
|-
| rowspan=2|79Cu
| rowspan=2 style="text-align:right" | 29
| rowspan=2 style="text-align:right" | 50
| rowspan=2|78.95456(54)#
| rowspan=2|188(25) ms
| β−, n (55%)
| 78Zn
| rowspan=2|3/2−#
| rowspan=2|
| rowspan=2|
|-
| β− (45%)
| 79Zn
|-
| 80Cu
| style="text-align:right" | 29
| style="text-align:right" | 51
| 79.96087(64)#
| 100# ms [>300 ns]
| β−
| 80Zn
|
|
|

Medical applications 
Copper offers a relatively large number of radioisotopes that are potentially suitable for use in nuclear medicine.

There is a growing interest in the use of 64Cu, 62Cu, 61Cu, and 60Cu for diagnostic purposes and 67Cu and 64Cu for targeted radiotherapy.
For example, 64Cu has a longer half-life than most positron-emitters (12.7 hours) and is thus ideal for diagnostic PET imaging of biological molecules.

References 

 Isotope masses from:

 Isotopic compositions and standard atomic masses from:

 Half-life, spin, and isomer data selected from the following sources.

 Application of Copper radioisotopes in Medicine (Review Paper):

 
Copper
Copper